Buxar Thermal Power Plant is a coal-based thermal power plant located at Chausa village in Buxar district, Bihar, India. It was conceptualized in 2013 when SJVN signed an MoU with Bihar State Power Holding Company Limited (BSPHCL) and Bihar Infrastructure Company (BPIC). Prime Minister Narendra Modi laid the foundation stone for this project in March 2019. Larsen & Toubro Limited holds the contract for the construction, at an estimated cost of Rs 7,000 crores. It is scheduled to open in 2023.

Capacity
The planned capacity of the power plant will be 1320 MW (2x660 MW).

See also

Electricity sector in India
Ultra Mega Power Projects
Bihar State Power Holding Company Limited

References

External links

Coal-fired power stations in Bihar
Aurangabad district, Bihar
Son River basin
Proposed power stations in India